The Dacia Pick-Up was a range of pick-up trucks manufactured by Romanian auto marque Dacia. The 31 years of production saw the manufacturing of a total of 318,969 vehicles.

The Pick-up was the last of the Dacia models to be based on the Renault 12 that made up the majority of the Dacia model range since the late 1960s. In 2006, the line was discontinued and replaced by Dacia Logan Pick-Up. A popular name for this car is the "Papuc" (literally, slipper) due to its shape that resembles a slipper.

History
The Dacia Pick-Up was derived from the Dacia 1300 platform and was introduced in 1975. First known as the Dacia 1302, it was made in three series: the first, with straight rear wings and a small rear window; the second, with corrugated rear wings and a small rear window; and the third, with corrugated rear wings and a full-size rear window.

In 1982, after the 1302 was dropped, the Dacia 1304 single-cab pick-up model was introduced, followed by the drop-side coupé utility in 1983, the 1307/1309 double cab models in 1992; the 1305, a front-wheel drive version of the pick-up model, in 1994, and a king cab model, in 1995. These model lines were a commercial success and were gradually facelifted and modified, along with the rest of the range, until December 2006. They were marketed bearing the new blue logo of the manufacturer after 2003.

On the UK market the Pick-Up was known as the One-Ton and, from November 1985, the Shifter.

The vehicle was available with a number of different transmission styles including front wheel drive, rear wheel drive and 4x4.

During its time in production many types of engines were available to power the truck: a 1.3 litre, 1.4 litre, or 1.6 litre petrol engines or 1.9 litre Renault diesel engine.

Versions
Dacia 1302 – 2-door pick-up based on Dacia 1300 Pick-up
Dacia 1304 Pick Up – 2-door pick-up based on Dacia 1310
Dacia 1304 King Cab – 2-door pick-up with extended cab
Dacia 1304 Drop Side – 2-door pick-up with hinged panels
Dacia 1307 Double Cab – 4-door pick-up with crew cab and long wheelbase
Dacia 1309 – 4-door pick-up with short bed, based on Dacia 1310 Break

Gallery

Engines

See also
 Dacia 1300
 Dacia Logan Pick-Up

References

External links

Photographs

Other links
 Dacia Pick-Up – Short history and photos
 Dacia Vintage – Brochures gallery

Gamma
Cars of Romania
Front-wheel-drive vehicles
All-wheel-drive vehicles
Rear-wheel-drive vehicles
Pickup trucks
1980s cars
1990s cars
2000s cars
Cars introduced in 1975